Julie Blaise (born 8 November 1975 in Antibes) is a French former freestyle swimmer who competed in the 1992 Summer Olympics.

References

1979 births
Living people
People from Antibes
French female freestyle swimmers
Olympic swimmers of France
Swimmers at the 1992 Summer Olympics
Mediterranean Games medalists in swimming
Mediterranean Games gold medalists for France
Swimmers at the 1993 Mediterranean Games
Sportspeople from Alpes-Maritimes